Bharat Agnihotri (born April 9, 1953) is a Canadian politician and a former member of the Legislative Assembly of Alberta.  He represented the constituency of Edmonton-Ellerslie, sitting as a Liberal. He was elected in the 2004 election, but was defeated in the 2008 election.

Early life 
Agnihotri was born in India, and graduated from Guru Nanak Dev University in Amritsar with a Bachelor of Arts in Economics and Political Science. In 1976, he immigrated to England, where he lived until 1990, when he came to Edmonton. He began work as a realtor in 1997.

Politics

Electoral record 
Agnihotri first sought election in the 2001 provincial election, when he ran as a Liberal in Edmonton Mill Creek against incumbent Gene Zwozdesky. Zwozdesky had been elected as a Liberal the previous election, and Agnihotri had volunteered for his campaign. However, Zwozdesky had left the Liberal caucus in July 1998, and joined the Progressive Conservatives a month later, and it was under their banner that he was seeking re-election. Agnihotri finished second, with 29% of the vote, nearly four thousand votes behind Zwozdesky.

The next election, Agnihotri ran in Edmonton Ellerslie, which had been vacated by Liberal Debby Carlson, who had resigned to run in the 2004 federal election. Agnihotri won a narrow victory, finishing 199 votes ahead of Progressive Conservative Gurnam Dodd. He sought re-election in the 2008 election, but was defeated by the Progressive Conservative candidate.

Legislative initiatives 
In 2007, Agnihotri sponsored the Freedom of Information and Protection of Privacy (Repeal of Ministerial Briefing Exemption) Amendment Act, would have eliminated ministerial briefings from the list of documents exempt from public disclosure under the province's access to information provisions. It never reached second reading.

Community Initiatives Program incident 
On April 3, 2007, Agnihotri became the first MLA to be named—that is, asked by the Speaker to leave the assembly—in Ken Kowalski's nine years as speaker. This occurred as result of questions he asked Minister of Tourism, Parks, Recreation and Culture Hector Goudreau about the Community Initiatives Program, which dispenses grants to community groups. Agnihotri began by noting that, despite a rule that unmatched grants could not exceed ten thousand dollars, forty-three groups had received unmatched grants exceeding that amount. He then asked if these groups included any who had made donations to the leadership campaigns of Ed Stelmach, Dave Hancock, Lyle Oberg, or Ted Morton—all of whom were cabinet ministers and all of whom had refused to disclose full lists of donors from their leadership campaigns: "Can this minister assure this house that groups receiving this special treatment are not secret friends of top Tories?" Hancock rose on a point of order, and Kowalski ruled that Agnihotri's question impugned the integrity of the ministers, and that the question was a party matter that had no place in the legislature. He asked Agnihotri three times to apologize and, after Agnihotri refused, he named him. Agnihotri was not to be allowed back into the Legislature until he apologized and all members of the assembly agreed to re-admit him. He apologized the next day, saying that his constituents wanted him to and that "if you stay outside, you're not going to help Albertans, so better you go inside and fight for it."

Post-political career
After his defeat in 2008, Agnihotri announced plans to return to work as a realtor.

Personal life 
Agnihotri is married to Rita and has two children. He enjoys cricket and table tennis.

Election results 

{| class="wikitable"
| colspan="3" align=center|2004 Alberta general election results (Edmonton Ellerslie)
| colspan="2"|Turnout 43.4%
|-
| colspan="2" rowspan="1" align="left" valign="top" | Affiliation
| valign="top" |Candidate
| valign="top" |Votes
| valign="top" align="right"|%

References 

1953 births
Living people
Alberta Liberal Party MLAs
Canadian real estate agents
Politicians from Amritsar
Politicians from Edmonton
Indian emigrants to Canada
Canadian politicians of Indian descent
Guru Nanak Dev University alumni
21st-century Canadian politicians